Sarvanjit Singh is an Indian field hockey player who was a part of India Men's Hockey Team, as a forward, during the 2012 London Olympics.

Early life 
Singh hails from Gurdaspur town in Punjab, India.

Career

Hockey India League
Sarvanjit Singh plays for  Ranchi Rays  in the Hockey India League.

Career achievements
 Sarvanjit Singh was member of Indian Olympic squad for 2012 Olympics.
 Sarvanjit Singh was the captain of Punjab Team which was crowned champion in Senior National Championship 2012.

References

External links 
 

1988 births
Living people
Asian Games medalists in field hockey
Field hockey players at the 2010 Asian Games
Field hockey players from Punjab, India
Commonwealth Games silver medallists for India
Field hockey players at the 2012 Summer Olympics
Field hockey players at the 2010 Commonwealth Games
Commonwealth Games medallists in field hockey
Indian male field hockey players
Olympic field hockey players of India
Asian Games bronze medalists for India
Medalists at the 2010 Asian Games
2010 Men's Hockey World Cup players
Medallists at the 2010 Commonwealth Games